From the Tea-rooms of Mars .... (fully titled: From the Tea-rooms of Mars .... to the Hell-holes of Uranus) is the second album by Landscape which was released in 1981. The album contains the band's only UK chart hits: "Einstein a Go-Go" which reached No. 5 in April 1981 and "Norman Bates" which reached No. 40 in June of the same year.

The album was reissued in 1992 on the Mau Mau Records label. This CD also includes Landscape's first album, Landscape. The album was reissued again in 2002 on the Cherry Red Records label.

Track listing

LP: RCA LP AFL1-5003

1992 Mau Mau Records CD: MAU CD 618

2002 Cherry Red Records CD: CDMRED 209

 Tracks 11-12 from the album Manhattan Boogie-Woogie (1982) produced by Landscape
 Tracks 13-14 extended versions of singles released as 'Landscape III' (1983) produced by Richard James Burgess, John Walters and Andy Pask

Personnel
Landscape
Richard James Burgess - vocals, computer programming, electronic drums and percussion, synthesizers and drums. Roland MC8 microcomposer, System 100 modular synths, SDS-V electronic drums, Pearl drums, claptrap, Burgess amplified percussion
Christopher Heaton - keyboards and vocals. Yamaha CS80 polyphonic synthesizer, grand piano, Fender Rhodes piano with ring modulator and effects, Casiotone 201 digital keyboard, Minimoog, Roland vocoders, Roland Chorus Echo
Andy Pask - bass guitar, bass synthesizers and vocals. Giffin fretted and fretless basses, Yamaha CS80, Roland ProMars synthesizer
Peter Thoms - electronic trombone, trombone and vocals. King 3B Trombone, Barcus Berry tranducer and graphic pre-amp, Roland pitch/voltage synthesizer and Chorus Echo, MXR Blue Box
John Walters - computer programming, wind synthesizers and Vocals. Computone wind synthesizer driver and Lyricon 1, Roland MC8, ProMars and System 100 synthesizers and vocoder, Selmer MKVI soprano saxophone

Production
Producer: Landscape
"European Man" produced by Colin Thurston and Landscape
Engineered by: John Etchells at JAMJohn Hudson and Brian Tench at Mayfair SoundHugh Padgham at the Town HouseAndy Jackson, Peter Walsh, Rafe McKenna and Peter Smith at UtopiaSteve Rance and Graeme Jackson at Nova SuiteRik Walton at WorkhouseDave Hunt at Berry StreetDavid Baker at OdysseyColin Thurston at Red BusLandscape at Southern Studios

Audio excerpts

References

1981 albums
Landscape (band) albums
Albums produced by Colin Thurston
Albums produced by Richard James Burgess
RCA Records albums